Mecaspis is a genus of cylindrical weevils belonging to the family Curculionidae. This genus is present in most of Europe, in the East Palearctic realm, in the Near East and in North Africa.

Species 
 Mecaspis alternans (Herbst, 1795) 
 Mecaspis bedeli Faust, 1904 
 Mecaspis emarginata (Fabricius, 1787) 
 Mecaspis incisurata (Gyllenhal, 1834) 
 Mecaspis nana (Gyllenhal, 1834) 
 Mecaspis striatella (Fabricius, 1792)

References 

 Biolib
 Fauna Europaea
 Catalogue of Life

External links 

Lixinae